Pavel Klenyo (born 28 April 1999) is a Belarusian professional footballer who plays for Rogachev.

References

External links 
 
 

1999 births
Living people
Belarusian footballers
Association football midfielders
FC Neman Stolbtsy players
FC Torpedo Minsk players
FC Gomel players
FC Lokomotiv Gomel players
FC Torpedo-BelAZ Zhodino players
FC Minsk players
FC Dnepr Rogachev players